Rod Laver defeated the defending champion Ken Rosewall in the final, 6–4, 6–3, 6–4 to win the men's singles tennis title at the 1969 French Open. It was the second leg of his eventual second Grand Slam, which remains the only Grand Slam achieved in men's singles tennis in the Open Era.

Seeds
The seeded players are listed below. Rod Laver is the champion; others show the round in which they were eliminated.

  Rod Laver (champion)
  Tony Roche (semifinals)
  Ken Rosewall (final)
  John Newcombe (quarterfinals)
  Tom Okker (semifinals)
  Arthur Ashe (fourth round)
  Roy Emerson (fourth round)
  Andrés Gimeno (quarterfinals)
  Manuel Santana (fourth round)
  Željko Franulović (quarterfinals)
  Marty Riessen (second round)
  Ismail El Shafei (third round)
  Jan Kodeš (fourth round)
  Bob Hewitt (third round)
  Earl Butch Buchholz (second round)
  Stan Smith (fourth round)

Qualifying

Draw

Key
 Q = Qualifier
 WC = Wild card
 LL = Lucky loser
 r = Retired

Finals

Section 1

Section 2

Section 3

Section 4

Section 5

Section 6

Section 7

Section 8

See also
 Laver-Rosewall rivalry

External links
 Association of Tennis Professionals (ATP) – 1969 French Open Men's Singles draw
1969 French Open – Men's draws and results at the International Tennis Federation

Men's Singles
French Open by year – Men's singles
French